Massey Sound is a natural, uninhabited waterway through the Canadian Arctic Archipelago in Qikiqtaaluk, Nunavut, Canada. It separates Amund Ringnes Island (to the west) from Axel Heiberg Island (to the east). To the north the sound opens into the Peary Channel, and to the south into Norwegian Bay. Haig-Thomas Island lies in the sound.

Sounds of Qikiqtaaluk Region